"Your Mother's Son-In-Law" is a song written by Alberta Nichols and Mann Holiner that was recorded by Billie Holiday with a band led by Benny Goodman on 27 November 1933. It was Holiday's first recording. It was produced by John Hammond. The song was recorded in three takes, and Holiday was paid $35 for her performance. 

Holiday was initially nervous as she prepared to make her first recording. The singer Ethel Waters was present in the studio, which further increased her anxiousness. Waters had recorded in the same studio earlier in the day with the same band. Holiday was also intimidated by the presence of the famous vaudevillian Buck Washington who played the piano on the recording. Buck encouraged her to sing, telling her that she wouldn't want "all these people" to think that she was a 'square'. The song was recorded in a key that Holiday was uncomfortable with and at a faster pace than she wanted at Goodman's behest. Holiday's biographer John Szwed describes the arrangement as "busy" and "too fast". Szwed wrote that the arrangement "pitched her voice so high that it forced her to virtually shout over the band".

In his book Texan Jazz, Dave Oliphant noted that on the song Holiday was already utilising her noted "quavering drop" at the end of words which was possibly adapted from the trumpet stylings of Louis Armstrong and began words with a "gruffness" to lend her vocal lines forcefulness and personality. Oliphant highlights Jack Teagarden's trombone solo on the song, noting that it shares with Holiday's vocal "some of the same exuberance in the face of the wistful and (even inappropriate lyrics)". Oliphant praises Benny Goodman's clarinet solo as that of a "consummate swing artist".

The song later appeared in Lew Leslie's revue Blackbirds of 1934.

In a 1956 interview with Willis Conover for Voice of America's Jazz Hour, Holiday claimed that she was 14 years old at the time of the recording (she was actually eighteen) and that the song "sounds like I was doing comedy" as "my voice sounds so funny and high".

The lyrics of the song reference the opera singer Jules Bledsoe and the actor and singer George Jessel, popular musical artists at the time of the recording.

Personnel

Billie Holiday – vocals
Charlie Teagarden, Shirley Clay – trumpet
Jack Teagarden – trombone
Benny Goodman – clarinet
Art Karle – tenor saxophone
Buck Washington or Joe Sullivan – piano
Dick McDonough – guitar
Artie Bernstein – double bass
Gene Krupa – drums
Deane Kincaide – arranger

References

External links
"Your Mother's Son-In-Law" at Discogs

1933 songs
1933 singles
Benny Goodman songs
Billie Holiday songs
Columbia Records singles